Nicholas John Higham,  (born 1951) is a British archaeologist, historian, and academic. He was Professor of Early Medieval and Landscape History at the University of Manchester, and is now an emeritus professor.

Higham was trained as an archaeologist at Manchester, receiving his Doctor of Philosophy (PhD) in 1977. He taught at Manchester from 1977 to 2011.

Honours and prizes

 Elected Fellow of the Society of Antiquaries of London (FSA) on 11 November 1989

Bibliography

 with Barri Jones, The Carvetti, Sutton (Gloucester, England), 1985, new edition, 1991.
 The Northern Counties to AD 1000, Regional History of England, Longman, (New York, NY), 1986.
 Rome, Britain, and the Anglo-Saxons, Seaby (London, England), 1992.
 The Kingdom of Northumbria: AD 350-1100, Sutton (Gloucester, England), 1993.
 The Origins of Cheshire, Manchester University Press (Manchester, England), 1993.
 An English Empire: Bede and the Early Anglo-Saxon Kings, Manchester University Press (Manchester, England), 1995.
 The English Conquest: Gildas and Britain in the Fifth Century, Manchester University Press (Manchester, England), 1994. (review by Christopher A. Snyder)
 The Convert Kings: Power and Religious Affiliation in Early Anglo-Saxon England, Manchester University Press (Manchester, England), 1997.
 The Death of Anglo-Saxon England, Sutton (Gloucester, England), 1997.
 The Norman Conquest, Sutton (Gloucester, England), 1998.
 King Arthur: Myth-making and History, Routledge (New York, NY), 2002.
 A Frontier Landscape, 2004
 King Arthur: The Making of the Legend, 2018

References

External links
 Staff of the Manchester School of Arts, Languages and Cultures

British medievalists
Living people
Academics of the University of Manchester
Fellows of the Society of Antiquaries of London
Historians of the British Isles
1951 births
Anglo-Saxon studies scholars
Landscape historians